Of All People is a Canadian biographical television series which aired on CBC Television from 1972 to 1974.

Premise
This series featured profiles of Canadians who were not celebrities such as couple Fred and Mary Allison celebrating a 50th anniversary, octogenarian coin and stamp collector Vinnie Green, Newfoundlander Leonard Evans and his 14 children, and Uxbridge Township dogcatcher Anne Barrett. One episode included poet Al Purdy who later received the Order of Canada and Order of Ontario.

Production
Segment producers included Martyn Burke, Martin Lavut and Donald Shebib.
The theme music for the series was a song called "You Of All People", written and performed by Jack Schechtman. The song was released on his album, "From Soup to Nuts".

Scheduling
This half-hour series was broadcast on Mondays at 10:00 p.m. (Eastern) from 12 June to 21 August 1972. It returned the following year on Sundays at 10:30 p.m. from 27 May to 19 August 1973, then finally Mondays at 10:00 p.m. from 3 June to 2 September 1974.

References

External links
 

CBC Television original programming
1972 Canadian television series debuts
1974 Canadian television series endings